Jack Palmer may refer to:

 Jack Palmer (boxer) (1879–1928), English heavyweight boxer
 Jack Palmer (comics), cartoon character created by René Pétillon
 Jack Palmer (composer) (1900–1976), American pianist and composer
 Jack Palmer (cricketer) (1903–1979), Australian cricketer
 Jack Palmer (footballer) (1905–1946), Australian rules footballer